Mykel “Boom Boom” Benson (born December 30, 1987) is an American football fullback who is currently a free agent. He was signed by the Milwaukee Mustangs as an undrafted free agent in 2011. He played college football and college baseball at Florida A&M University.

Benson was assigned to the Philadelphia Soul on January 13, 2017. He was placed on recallable reassignment on April 1, 2017. He was activated April 5, 2017. He earned First Team All-Arena honors in 2017. On August 26, 2017, the Soul beat the Tampa Bay Storm in ArenaBowl XXX by a score of 44–40.

On April 17, 2018, he was assigned to the Baltimore Brigade. On June 14, 2018, he was placed on reassignment. The next day, he was claimed off reassignment by the Albany Empire. Benson was named to his third All-Arena Team in 2019, en route to winning his second championship with Albany that same year.

References

External links
Arena Football League bio

1987 births
Living people
American football fullbacks
Florida A&M Rattlers football players
Florida A&M Rattlers baseball players
Milwaukee Mustangs (2009–2012) players
Georgia Force players
Orlando Predators players
San Antonio Talons players
Arizona Rattlers players
Philadelphia Soul players
Baltimore Brigade players
Albany Empire (AFL) players
Players of American football from Florida
People from Palm Bay, Florida